Riccardo Broschi (c. 1698 – 1756) was a composer of baroque music and the brother of the opera singer Carlo Broschi, known as Farinelli.

Life
Broschi was born in Naples, the son of Salvatore Broschi, a composer and chapelmaster of the Cathedral of the Puglinese citizens, and Caterina Berrese (according to the Book of Baptisms of the Church of S. Nicola, today near the Episcopal Archives).

The Broschi family moved to Naples at the end of 1711, and enrolled Riccardo, their firstborn, in the Conservatory of S. Maria di Loreto, where he would study to become a composer under G. Perugino and F. Mancinipresso. Salvatore, meanwhile, died unexpectedly, at age 36, on 4 November 1717. Caterina subsequently made Riccardo head of the family.

He made his debut in 1725 with La Vecchia Sorda. Next, he moved to London in 1726 and stayed there until 1734 and wrote six heroic operas, his most successful being Artaserse. In 1737 he moved to Stuttgart and briefly served at the Stuttgart court (1736-7) for Charles Alexander, Duke of Württemberg, then returned to Naples before joining his brother in Madrid in 1739. He died in Madrid.

Selected works
La Vecchia Sorda (Naples, 1725)
L’Isola Di Alcina (Rome, 1728)
Idaspe (25 January 1730, Teatro San Giovanni Grisostomo)
Ombra fedele anch'io ("As a faithful shadow I'll be"), aria for soprano castrato
Arianna e Teseo (Milan, 1731)
Merope (Turin, 1732)
Artaserse (London, 1734 - in collaboration with Johann Adolf Hasse)
Pallido il sole ("The sun is pale"), mad scene aria for soprano castrato (by Hasse)
Nerone (Rome, 1735)
Adriano in Siria (Milan, 1735)

Broschi on screen
The dramatic relationship between the Broschi brothers is the quintessence of the movie Farinelli (1994), in which a few of his works are performed.

References

External links
http://www.haendel.it/compositori/broschi.htm

1690s births
1756 deaths
Italian Baroque composers
Italian male classical composers
Italian opera composers
Male opera composers
18th-century Italian composers
18th-century Italian male musicians
Pupils of Nicola Porpora
Musicians from Naples